Neville Hamilton Rogers (9 March 1918 – 7 October 2003) was an English first-class cricketer who played for Hampshire.

Rogers was a right-handed top order batsman and scored a century before lunch against the touring West Indians in 1950. He never played for England but came close in 1951, acting at the 12th man in a Test against South Africa at The Oval. He passed 1000 runs in a season every year from 1947 until 1955. His highest season total was 2244 runs in 1952 and made his highest score of 186 against Gloucestershire the previous year.

External links
Cricinfo

1918 births
2003 deaths
English cricketers
Hampshire cricketers
Marylebone Cricket Club cricketers
Non-international England cricketers
North v South cricketers
T. N. Pearce's XI cricketers